Upper Roddlesworth Reservoir is a reservoir on the River Roddlesworth near Abbey Village in Lancashire, England.

The reservoir is close to Lower Roddlesworth Reservoir and Rake Brook Reservoir and sits within dense woodland.

History
The construction of reservoirs on Rivington Pike was the first major attempt by Liverpool Corporation Waterworks to obtain water from outside of the city of Liverpool. These were used to supply compensation water, to maintain the flows in the existing river system. The engineer for the project was Thomas Hawksley, and the scheme, which included a bank of filters at Rivington and a  pipeline to carry the water to Liverpool, was completed in 1857.

Upper Roddlesworth Reservoir was constructed under a separate Act of Parliament, obtained in 1860. It is unclear who designed the reservoir or supervised its construction, although it was not Hawksley. The work was completed in 1865, and increased the storage capacity of the Rivington chain by about six per cent. There have been a number of issues with the dam since its construction. The hole was filled with puddle clay, but another hole appeared at that point 21 months later. A search of the archives revealed that the engineer building the dam had encountered problems with springs, but had reported that they had been solved. The solution adopted in 1906 was to install a  cast iron pipe vertically upwards from the bottom of the shaft, with a  outlet feeding into the reservoir. The bottom  of the shaft were then filled with stones and gravel, while the rest of it was packed with puddle clay, and no subsequent subsidence occurred at that site.

Further problems occurred in January 1954, when the toe of the dam, which was formed of sand, was washed away as a result of heavy rainfall. Water running off from the higher ground at either side of the dam ran along a berm near the foot of the dam, causing the sand to flow away, and a landslip to occur. This was resolved by improving the drainage system on the downstream side of the dam, and by creating channels to divert run-off water away from the dam at its outer edges.

As a result of the passing of the Water Act 1973, responsibility for Liverpool's water supply and sewerage passed to a regional water authority, and thus Upper Roddlesworth Reservoir became one of the assets of the newly-formed North West Water Authority. The Conservative Party then saw privatisation as a way to deal with the huge funding gap facing the water industry, and responsibility for the reservoir passed to the water and sewerage company North West Water plc following the passing of the Water Act 1989. North West Water merged with Norweb in 1995 to become United Utilities, the present owners of the asset. The water now supplies customers in the Wigan area rather than in Liverpool. The reservoir holds around  when full.

Bibliography

References

West Pennine Moors
Drinking water reservoirs in England
Geography of Chorley
Reservoirs in Lancashire